Pasjač is a village in the municipality of Pirot, Serbia. According to the 2002 census, the village has a population of 32 people.
The number of inhabitants is decreasing and the rest are mostly old people. According to the 2011., census, the village has a population of 13 people, in 2018 only 6.,

References

Populated places in Pirot District